Fountain Street Church in Grand Rapids, Michigan, was for a time unique in the United States as being large, religiously liberal and non-denominational in a notably conservative city.  It arose from its beginnings as a Baptist church which responded to the ascendency of liberal Christianity in the late 19th century, primarily through graduates of the University of Chicago Divinity School, which was a leader in the movement.

Established in the largest town in West Michigan, in 1869 as Fountain Street Baptist Church, by 1960 FSC surrendered its Baptist name and identity altogether to become an independent, non-denominational liberal church.  In 1959, a book chronicling the story of Fountain Street Church titled Liberal Legacy – A History of Fountain Street Church was published in-house by Philip Buchen, a member of the church and legal advisor to President Gerald Ford.

In the years between 1896 and 2006 Fountain Street Church eventually shed its explicitly Christian identity for a non-creedal spiritual life that closely approximated Unitarian Universalism.  Its newest mantra to "Free the Mind, Grow the Soul and Change the World" summarizes the church's approach to religion from the earlier days to this.

History
The roots of Fountain Street Church date to 1824, when the region's original Baptist mission established itself “to convert the Ottawa Native Americans.” A lengthy history of institutional squabbles between themselves and other area Baptists eventually culminated in the two factions' reunion in 1869 to create Fountain Street Baptist Church (so named for the building they erected on the east side of downtown Grand Rapids).

Following the ministry of John L. Jackson, the church selected John Herman Randall, a young graduate of the new University of Chicago Divinity School . Over his 10-year ministry, Randall effectively converted Fountain Street Baptist Church from orthodox to progressive, reflecting the spirit of the Divinity School which is still known for its liberal approach to religious studies.  He left to serve Mount Morris Baptist Church in New York City and eventually moved on to serve with John Haynes Holmes' Community Church of New York, beginning a kinship with Unitarians that continues to this day.  Randall's son, John Herman Randall, Jr., became a noted philosopher at Columbia University

While Randall's career moved the church toward a more liberal direction, his successor, Alfred Wesley Wishart — also a graduate of the UC Divinity School— permanently set FSC on a liberal path.  Wishart's career was marked by three significant events: 1) The 1911 Furniture Workers Strike, 2) the rebuilding of the church following destruction by fire in 1917, and 3) the use of FSC as a public venue for debates and lectures that brought world-famous faces and voices to Grand Rapids.

The 1911 Furniture Workers Strike 
Coming early in Wishart's career at FSC, the Furniture Workers Strike began as an effort to organize the furniture-making factories once so common to Grand Rapids.  When the union's demands for a nine-hour day, pay by the hour and a 10 percent raise of the average wage were denied, Wishart and others intervened to try to prevent a strike with a commission whose report supported management.  The workers went on strike for 17 weeks, ultimately failing in their efforts.

While supportive of Labor in principle, Wishart did not approve of union tactics.  However, his social secretary (social worker) Viva Flaherty was publicly supportive of the workers, making the strike issue one that divided sympathies in the church as well as the community.  Ms Flaherty had begun her career at FSC working with John Randall and chided Wishart for lacking the zeal she found in his predecessor.

The Church burns 
In May 1917, the American neo-Gothic building which housed Fountain Street Church burned to the ground.  No cause was ever determined.  The massive neo-Romanesque structure which now stands in its place was completed in 1924 following seven years of work and planning on behalf of Wishart and the church (during which time worshipping took place at Powers Theater).  Designed to serve as a public auditorium as well as a house of worship, the new building had a seating capacity of over 1500.  The large bell tower became part of the city's official World War I Memorial, with tower room dedicated to the memory of those slain in the war which remains part of the church to this day.

Great debates 
In 1928, three years after his notable defense of John Scopes, Clarence Darrow came to FSC to debate Wishart on the subject of whether a "belief in a general purpose of the universe is rational and justified."  Other notables had appeared before at the church, but this particular debate, conducted in the still-new auditorium, marked the beginning of FSC's inviting national and world figures to Grand Rapids to share their opinions and otherwise bring the world to West Michigan. A partial list and description of those who have appeared follows below.

After Wishart 
Wishart died in 1933 while still serving, leaving a church building with a substantial mortgage to pay off at the outset of the Great Depression.  His successor, Milton McGorrill, thus endured a difficult ministry, though he was the first FSC preacher to begin broadcasting his sermons. He left after 10 years to pursue a more prosperous career on the East Coast, ultimately serving both Baptist and Unitarian churches in New England.

Following his departure, Fountain Street Baptist Church found itself at its lowest ebb since 1869, with the mortgage taking up nearly half of the annual budget and the Great Depression making each year more challenging than the last. Attendance was barely above 100, and it was clear that a different and daring direction had to be pursued in order for Fountain Street Church to survive.

The search committee again consulted the University of Chicago Divinity School, taking the university's recommendation to consider a young minister in Kenilworth Illinois named Duncan Littlefair.

Arriving in 1944 at the age of 32, Littlefair preached in a manner unprecedented in a town heretofore saturated by a strictly conservative religious culture.  His personal manner was also remarkable, as he was known to drive a convertible, wear a beret and smoke cigarettes in public.  A scandal to some, a radical to others, Littlefair nevertheless saw the church grow from less than 200 in attendance to over 1000 regular weekly worshippers shortly after he arrived.  At its height under Littlefair's ministry, FSC reckoned over 2000 members.

Littlefair's tenure redefined the church, jettisoning the Baptist name and association, rewriting its bylaws and restructuring its governance and management.  The traditional Sunday School was remodeled on the then-new theory of character development and so was called 'Character School'.  Youth programming at its height involved over 200 high schoolers who brought rock 'n roll bands to the church along with notable speakers, just as their own parents had.  Many major bands of the era performed there under "Fountain Club" sponsorship, including The Mothers of Invention, The Moody Blues, and Alice Cooper.

It wasn't until 1960 that FSC formally separated from the American Baptists and dropped its Baptist name (although it remains on the building's cornerstone). Littlefair himself had by then changed his clergy affiliation to the UUA, but despite his suggestions that FSC might or even should join the denomination, he ultimately preferred that the church remain independent and non-denominational.

Littefair's high-water mark came when friend and member Philip Buchen brought him to Washington, D.C. to give advice on whether President Gerald Ford should pardon President Richard Nixon. Though himself a social liberal, Littlefair defended the action publicly, despite strong feelings in the church that doing so was wrong.  One lasting effect was the impact of his friend Joseph Campbell.  Returning several times over the years, his theories echoed those of Littefair and deeply affected many members' own spiritual life.

Littefair retired in 1980.  In 1982, the church selected David O. Rankin of the Unitarian Universalist Congregation of Atlanta to serve it, which he did for 16 years until his retirement. During that time, Rankin penned "Ten Things Commonly Believed Among Us", which continues to be widely used by the Unitarian Universalist Association as well as Fountain Street Church.  Rankin was also a regular contributor to American Rabbi magazine and well known in Unitarian circles, serving major churches in San Francisco and Indianapolis prior to coming to Grand Rapids.

Duncan Littlefair, meanwhile, remained active in the congregation, helping to choose Rankin's successor, Brent Smith, who, during his brief tenure, adapted FSC to the Internet age and rebuilt the church's organ.  Differences over leadership and finances led to Smith's departure less than two years after his arrival.

Littlefair died in January 2004, at the age of 91. The following fall, Fountain Street Church selected Weldon Frederick Wooden to serve as their Senior Minister. Wooden, too, was a graduate of the University of Chicago Divinity School, making Rankin the only Senior Minister not to have studied under their auspices.  He also continued the tradition of senior clergy who are from or connected to Unitarian Universalism, serving 11 years at the UU Congregational Society in Brooklyn New York, following service in Texas and Massachusetts.

Wooden, in fact, shares characteristics of his predecessors.  Like Wishart, he had served on the East Coast before coming to FSC.  Like McGorrill, he arrived at a time of economic uncertainty in the area.  Like Littlefair, he had never before served a large church.  Like Rankin, he was more a writer and thinker than an organizer.  Like Smith, he knew that 21st-century churches needed to adapt to advancements in technology and media.

In August 2010, the church was defaced with piles of feces at the entrances along with conservative Christian literature. The incident was not reported to the police. The church's "Peace Pole" in support of diversity had also been knocked down several times and now is anchored in concrete.

Post-Sesquicentennial

The church commemorated its 150th year in 2019 and was registered as a historic site.

In August 2020, the congregation elected the first woman and first nonwhite senior minister, Rev. Mariela Perez-Simons.

In February 2023, the congregation elected its first queer senior minster, Rev. Christopher Roe.

Clergy
Roster of Senior Clergy at Fountain Street Church:
 1842-1844:	Rev. T.Z.R. Jones
 1870-1885:	Rev. Samuel Graves
 1890-1896:	Rev. John L. Jackson
 1897-1906:	Rev. John Herman Randall
 1906-1933:	Rev. Alfred W. Wishart
 1933-1943:	Rev. Milton McGorrill
 1943-1944:	Rev. Edward Nelson
 1944-1979:	Dr. Duncan E. Littlefair
 1980-1996:	Dr. David O. Rankin
 1999-2001:	Dr. Brent Smith	
 2005-2020: 	Dr. W. Frederick Wooden
 2020-2021: 	Rev. Mariela Perez-Simons
 2021-present: Rev. Christopher Roe (interim from 2021-2023, elected to permanent Senior Minister on Feb. 12, 2023)
In addition, there have been many associate and interim clergy, and a variety of esteemed guest preachers including the late Rabbi Sherwin Wine and Forrest Church. A roster of all those who have served or preached at FSC is too extensive to list here.

Art and architecture
Fountain Street's original American Gothic church building, completed in April 1877, was destroyed by a fire in 1917. Under the leadership of senior minister, Rev. Alfred Wesley Wishart, a new church was designed and built over the next seven years. The Italian Romanesque sanctuary was dedicated in February 1924 with seating for approximately 1,500.

The present sanctuary reflects the beginnings of historic Christian church design. Rev. Wishart envisioned a basilica that “encompassed the refinements of art, the inspiration of character, and the techniques of science” and spoke of a church with “majestic architectural lines, color, form and shape in its tapestries, wood carvings, stonework, intricate mosaics, light, and glass”—all which were to be “symbols born of high purpose with a social point of view.”

Among the artwork which pervades the entire church building are Byzantine-styled oil-painted effigies, murals, coffered walnut and mosaic ceilings, Mercer-tiled floors, Romanesque stone columns and arcades, numerous mosaics (including Raphael’s “Madonna of the Chair”, reproduced by Salviati of Venice), rare furniture artifacts, painted glass, and an Alden B. Dow-designed chapel. A memorial tower room situated between the narthex and the main lobby is dedicated to soldiers who lost their lives in World War I and features a mosaic and gold-leaf domed-ceiling which portrays four guardian angels symbolizing “Justice, Liberty, Peace and Fraternity.”

Stained glass windows
Modeled after the Gothic cathedrals of France, particularly Chartres, FSC's 19 stained glass windows were installed in its new sanctuary in 1924. Traditional Biblical windows adorn the east wall of the sanctuary and depict the law and the Psalms, the Old Testament prophets, the Christ window, the Four Evangelists, and the Parables. Along the west side of the sanctuary are contrasting images that profile “wisdom, service, and freedom.” From Plato to Leonardo da Vinci, Desiderius Erasmus, Louis Pasteur, Charles Darwin, Roger Williams, George Washington, Thomas Jefferson and Abraham Lincoln, these windows reflect “liberty and justice for all.” A Youth Window in the northeast corner of the sanctuary affirms the church's development and nurture of children. High on the north wall is a massive Rose Window which measures 26 feet in diameter and was the first window to be installed in the new sanctuary.

Notable speakers and performers
Fountain Street Church has served as a platform for a variety of performers since 1928 when senior minister Alfred Wesley Wishart debated Clarence Darrow over the topic “Is There a General Purpose in the Universe?” Winston Churchill, Eleanor Roosevelt, Amelia Earhart, Robert Frost, Malcolm X, Paul Tillich, Robert F. Kennedy Jr., Kweisi Mfume, Irshad Manji, and Jim Wallis have all appeared at the church's behest.  Since 2009 Angela Davis, Margaret Atwood, Morris Dees, Nicholas Kristof, Louis Farrakhan, Christopher Hitchens & Peter Hitchens, and Nikki Giovanni have also appeared there through organizations with which the church is partnered, such as the Diversity Learning Center of Grand Rapids Community College.  Overall, more than 100 speakers have appeared.  In addition, notable musicians who have performed in the Sanctuary include Dave Brubeck, Stan Kenton, Ella Fitzgerald, Duke Ellington, Frank Zappa, MC5, Alison Krauss, Richie Havens, U2,  Arlo Guthrie and B.B. King.

The church was also a venue for Gilda's Laugh Fest in 2012 hosting such comedians as Bo Burnham and Miranda Sings.

Organ

Fountain Street Church houses one of the most comprehensive organs in the Midwest. Dubbed "Catherine the Great," the Austin-Allen organ was first installed in 1924 and fully restored in 2003 through the support of church members. The organ features 8,000 pipes, with the largest being 32 feet high and the smallest the size of a pencil. The five-manual organ of 250 draw knobs has 138 ranks of pipes and 34 digital ranks for a total of 172 ranks (voices).

Youth and adult education
Fountain Street Church's youth ministries (called “Character School”) have evolved since the 1950s to serve nursery through kindergarten-age children along with grade-school youth (Voyage of Discovery), middle-schoolers (Tower Club) and high school students (Fountain Club). The Fountain Club has been known for their trips to places like Washington D.C. and New York City.  They most recently visited New Orleans and Dulac, Louisiana to help with hurricane relief.

According to the church literature, spiritual growth for Fountain Street youth “strives to create and sustain an intergenerational community of learning designed to inspire wonder and compassion toward self, community, the world and the Divine to foster individual decisions about God in a non-creedal, ecumenical environment."

The goal of religious education for adults is to help further members’ own spiritual journeys through programs that address the head, the heart and the spirit. Fountain Street Church encourages everyone to become lifelong learners in a spirit of open inquiry, controversy and lively discussions.

References

Further reading
 An Experience with Fountain Street Church – An Illustrated Study of Her Architecture and Arts, Sheryl Budnick, 1965
 Gathered at the River, Grand Rapids, Michigan, and Its People of Faith, James D. Bratt, Christopher H. Meehan, 1993
 Liberal Legacy: A History of Fountain Street Church, Vol. 1, Philip Buchen, 1959
 Liberal Legacy: A History of Fountain Street Church, Vol. 2, Roger Bertschausen, 1991
 The American Organist, Carlo Curley, November 2004
 The Windows of Fountain Street Church, The Art Committee of Fountain Street Church, 2000

Baptist churches in Michigan
Religion in Grand Rapids, Michigan
Evangelical churches in Michigan
Religious organizations established in 1869
19th-century churches in the United States
1869 establishments in Michigan